Kayaköyü is a village in the Eğil District of Diyarbakır Province in Turkey.

References

Villages in Eğil District